Lithocarpus beccarianus is a tree in the beech family Fagaceae. It is named for the Italian botanist Odoardo Beccari.

Description
The brown bark is scaly.

Distribution and habitat
Lithocarpus beccarianus is endemic to Borneo. Its habitat is dipterocarp forests up to  altitude.

References

beccarianus
Endemic flora of Borneo
Trees of Borneo
Plants described in 1880
Flora of the Borneo lowland rain forests